The 2006 United States Senate election in Mississippi was held November 7, 2006. Incumbent Republican Trent Lott won re-election to a fourth term.

Democratic primary

Candidates 
 Bill Bowlin, business consultant and Republican nominee for MS-01 in 1990
 Erik R. Fleming, State Representative
 James O'Keefe, businessman
 Catherine Starr, activist

Results

General election

Candidates 
 Erik R. Fleming (D), State Representative
 Trent Lott (R), incumbent U.S. Senator
 Harold Taylor (L)

Campaign 
Lott ran for re-election without facing any opposition in his party's primary. While it had been speculated that Lott might retire after his home was destroyed in Hurricane Katrina, he instead chose to run for re-election. Fleming is an African American, which represents 37% of the state's population. However, no African American has ever been elected to statewide office. The last black U.S. Senator was Hiram Revels, who was appointed and took office in 1870. Fleming got little help from the DSCC, which only donated $15,000 to his campaign.

Predictions

Results

See also 
 2006 United States Senate elections

References 
 Election Results

Further reading 
 Orey, Byron D'Andra. "Racial Threat, Republicanism, and the Rebel Flag: Trent Lott and the 2006 Mississippi Senate Race," National Political Science Review July 2009, Vol. 12, pp. 83-96

Mississippi
2006
2006 Mississippi elections